

T54

The Women's marathon race for class T54 wheelchair athletes at the 2004 Summer Paralympics followed a course from Marathon to the Panathinaiko Stadium, and started at 08:00 on 26 September. It was won by Kazu Hatanaka, representing .

References

W
Summer Paralympics
Marathons at the Paralympics
2004 Summer Paralympics
Summer Paralympics marathon T54